Clarisa Sagardía (born  in Buenos Aires) is an Argentine volleyball player. She is part of the Argentina women's national volleyball team, having played the Women's Pan-American Volleyball Cup (in 2006, 2015, 2016), the FIVB Volleyball World Grand Prix (in 2011, 2012, 2015, 2016), the 2015 FIVB Volleyball Women's World Cup in Japan 2018 FIVB Volleyball Women's World Championship, and the 2016 Summer Olympics in Brazil.

She has also played at junior level for the Argentine national team.

At club level she played for Vélez Sarsfield, Boca Juniors, Infinita Cantabria and Club Olimpo (Bahía Blanca) before moving to Makedones Axios in September 2016.

Clubs
  Vélez Sarsfield (2004–2006)
  Boca Juniors (2006–2009)
  Infinita Cantabria (2009–2010)
  Boca Juniors (2010–2014)
  Olimpo de Bahía Blanca (2014–2015)
  Boca Juniors (2015–2016)
  Makedones Axios (2016–2017)

References

External links
 Profile at FIVB
 Profile  at Boca Juniors

1989 births
Living people
Argentine women's volleyball players
Volleyball players from Buenos Aires
Olympic volleyball players of Argentina
Volleyball players at the 2016 Summer Olympics
Setters (volleyball)
Argentine expatriate sportspeople in Spain
Argentine expatriate sportspeople in Greece
Expatriate volleyball players in Spain
Expatriate volleyball players in Greece